Carl Weber (7 August 192525 December 2016) was a theatre director and a professor of drama at Stanford University. He was Bertolt Brecht's directing assistant and a dramaturg and actor at the Berliner Ensemble theatre company in 1952. After Brecht's death in 1956, Weber remained as a director of the company. He directed in major theatres in Germany, America, Canada and elsewhere since 1957. He produced English translations of German dramatist Heiner Müller.

He was born in Dortmund, Germany, and died in Los Altos, California.

Plays directed 

The Day of the Great Scholar Wu, Berliner Ensemble, Berlin, Germany, 1955
Private Life of the Master Race, Berliner Ensemble, 1957
Puntila, Friedrich Wolf Theater, Neu-Strelitz, Germany, 1958
Mad Money, Luebeck, Germany, 1959
Mother Courage, Luebeck, 1960
Die Hose, Deutsches Theater, Berlin, Germany, 1961
Trumpets and Drums, Luebeck, 1962
Andorra, Luebeck, 1962
The Parasite, Luebeck, 1962
The General's Dog, Luebeck, 1963, then Wuppertal, 1964
The Big Ear, Luebeck, 1963
Threepenny Opera, Aarhus, Denmark, 1963
The Caucasian Chalk Circle, Actors Workshop, San Francisco, CA, 1963
The Tutor, Memorial Auditorium, Stanford, CA, 1963, then Wuppertal, 1967
The Country Wife, Front Street Theatre, Memphis, TN, 1964
Two Gentlemen of Verona, Little Theatre, Stanford, CA, 1964
Woyzeck, Wuppertal, 1964
Incident at Vichy, Wuppertal, 1965
Gaspar Varro's Right, Wuppertal, 1965
The Snob, Aalborg, Denmark, 1966
Drums in the Night, University of California at Los Angeles, 1966
Chicken Soup with Barley, Schaubuehne, Berlin, Germany, 1966
The Birdlovers, National Theatre, Oslo, Norway, 1966
A Man Is a Man, Aalborg, Denmark, 1967
Cyrano de Bergerac, Repertory Theatre of Lincoln Center, New York City, 1968
Enrico IV, Yale Repertory Theatre, New Haven, CT, 1968
The Caucasian Chalk Circle, Asian Theatre Institute, New Delhi, India, 1968
The Miser, Repertory Theatre of Lincoln Center, 1968
The Empire Builders, National Theatre of Canada, Ottawa, Quebec, Canada, 1970
The Forest, Wuppertal, 1970
Naechtliche Huldigung, Schauspielhaus Zurich, Zurich, Switzerland, 1970
Die Hose, Schauspielhaus, Hamburg, Germany, 1970
Soldaten, Kammerspiele, Munich, Germany, 1970
The Madman and the Nun, Seventh Street Theatre, New York University, 1971
Ride across Lake Constance, Repertory Theatre of Lincoln Center, 1972
Kaspar, Brooklyn Academy of Music, Brooklyn, NY, 1973
The Waterhen, Brooklyn Academy of Music, 1973
The Entertainer, McCarter Theatre, Princeton, NJ, 1973
The Resistible Rise of Arturo Ui, Arena Stage, Washington, DC, 1974
Die Raeumung, Wuppertal, 1974
Julius Caesar, Arena Stage, 1975
JoAnne, Theatre at Riverside Church, New York City, 1976
Lincoln, Brooklyn Academy of Music, 1976
Heaven and Earth, Off-Center Theatre, New York City, 1977
Scenes from Country Life, Perry Street Theatre, New York City, 1978
Starluster, American Place Theatre, New York City, 1979
They Are Dying Out, Yale Repertory Theatre, 1979
Fueherbunker, American Place Theatre, 1981
Here the NY Times Mel Gussow's review:

https://www.nytimes.com/1981/06/03/theater/stage-snodgrass-s-fuehrer-bunker.html

The Broken Pitcher, Martinique Theatre, New York City, 1981
The Resistible Rise of Arturo Ui, Bad Staattestheater, Karlsruhe, Germany, 1982
Happy End, New York University, Second Avenue Theatre, New York City, 1984
Arden of Faversham, Little Theatre, Stanford, CA, 1986
The Affair in the Rue de Lourcine, Nitery, Stanford, 1989
The Physicists, Little Theatre, 1991
In the Jungle of the Cities, Little Theatre, 1994
Between East and West, Magic Theatre, San Francisco, CA, 1997
The Threepenny Opera, Memorial Auditorium, Stanford, 1999

Major Tours 
Toured as assistant director of Berliner Ensemble in Poland, 1952, Paris,France, 1954 and 1958, London, England, 1956, Moscow and Leningrad, U.S.S.R.(now Russia), 1957, Prague, Czechoslovakia (now the Czech Republic), 1958, Stockholm, Sweden, 1959, and Helsinki, Finland, 1959; toured as director with Buehnen der Hansestadt Luebeck in Denmark, 1960, 1961, and 1963.

Stage appearances 
 Young peasant, Mother Courage, Berliner Ensemble, 1952
 La Fontaine, Der Prozess der Jeanne d'Arc, Berliner Ensemble, 1953
 Secretary Kan Dshen, Hirse fuer die Achte, Berliner Ensemble, 1954
 Bizergan Kazbeki, The Caucasian Chalk Circle, Berliner Ensemble, 1955
 First tank Commander, Winterschlacht, Berliner Ensemble, 1955
 Pickpocket, Trumpets and Drums, Berliner Ensemble, 1955
 Young man, Mother Courage, Palace Theatre, London, England, 1956
 Mucius, Life of Galileo, Berliner Ensemble, 1957
 Various roles, The Investigation, Wuppertal, 1966

Television work 
Director
 Laughter in Mexico, Fernsehfunk (Berlin, Germany), 1957
 Die Unadlige Graefin, Fernsehfunk, 1958
 Infamien durch Melodien, Fernsehfunk, 1959
 Wasser fuer Canitoga, Fernsehfunk, 1960
 Falsch Baerte und Nasen, Fernsehfunk, 1961
 The Countess, Fernsehfunk

Television appearances 
Episodic
 Narrator, "Brecht and Handke and the Kabarett," Camera Three, CBS, 1972
 Narrator, "Peter Handke-Theatre and Ideas," Camera Three, CBS, 1973

Written works 
Stage Plays
 (with Peter Palitzsch) The Day of the Great Scholar Wu, Berliner Ensemble, 1955
 (Editor and translator) Heiner Mueller, Hamletmaschine and other texts for the stage, Performing Arts Journal Publications (New York City), 1984
 (Editor and translator) Heiner Mueller, The Battle: Plays, Poetry, Prose by Heiner Mueller, Performing Arts Journal Publications, 1989
 (Editor and translator) Heiner Mueller, Explosion of Memory: Writings by Heiner Mueller, Performing Arts Journal Publications, 1989
 (Editor and translator) DramaContemporary: Germany, Johns HopkinsUniversity Press (Baltimore, MD), 1996

Teleplays

Episodic

 "Brecht and Handke and the Kabarett," Camera Three, CBS, 1972
 "Peter Handke-Theatre and Ideas," Camera Three, CBS, 1973

See also
Epic theater
Fabel

References

Thomson, Peter and Glendyr Sacks, eds. 1994. The Cambridge Companion to Brecht. Cambridge Companion to Literature Ser. Cambridge: Cambridge University Press. . p.xv-xvi.
 Cynthia Haven, "Carl Weber is dead at 91. He was Bertolt Brecht's protégé and brought Germany's experimental theater to America." The Book Haven, 27 December 2016

External links
 Carl Weber (in German) from the archive of the Österreichische Mediathek

1925 births
2016 deaths
People from Dortmund
German theatre directors
Stanford University Department of Drama faculty